This is a list of Australian soccer transfers for the 2015–16 A-League. Only moves featuring at least one A-League club are listed.

Clubs were able to sign players at any time, but many transfers will only officially go through on 1 June because the majority of player contracts finish on 31 May.

Transfers

All players without a flag are Australian. Clubs without a flag are clubs participating in the A-League.

Pre-season

Mid-season

References

A-League Men transfers
transfers
Football transfers summer 2015
Football transfers winter 2015–16